Alex Felipe Nery (born August 14, 1975) is a former Brazilian football player.

Playing career
In summer 2001, Alex joined Japanese J2 League club Ventforet Kofu which finished at the bottom place for 2 years in a row (1999-2000). He debuted in J2 against Montedio Yamagata on July 7. He played many matches as regular midfielder after the debut. However Ventforet finished at the bottom place for 3 years in a row and he left Ventforet end of 2001 season.

Club statistics

References

External links

1975 births
Living people
Brazilian footballers
J2 League players
Ventforet Kofu players
Brazilian expatriate footballers
Expatriate footballers in Japan
Association football midfielders